Cat Spectacular! is the debut studio album by indie pop band Bearsuit. It was released in 2004 on Fortuna Pop!.

Track listing
 "Welcome Bearsuit Space hotel" – 2:04
 "Cookie Oh Jesus" – 2:57
 "Rodent Disco" – 2:08
 "Cherryade" – 2:57
 "I Feel the Heat of the Light from Heaven" – 0:48
 "Going Steady" – 2:30
 "Itsuko Got Married" – 2:32
 "Prove Katie Wrong" – 3:04
 "TSTM" – 3:11
 "Diagonal Girl" – 1:26
 "Kiki Keep Me Company" – 2:00
 "On Your Special Day" – 3:22

References

Bearsuit albums
2004 albums
Fortuna Pop! Records albums